BAF or Baf may refer to:

Biology
 Barrier-to-autointegration factor, a family of proteins
 BRG1, or hbrm-associated factors, a family of proteins; see SWI/SNF re BAF complex

Military
 Bagram Airfield
 Balkan Air Force, a late-World War II Allied air formation
 Bangladesh Air Force
 Belgian Air Force, previous name of the Belgian Air Component, ICAO code
 Benefield Anechoic Facility, installed systems for avionics test programs
 Bophuthatswana Air Force, the aviation branch of the military forces of Bophuthatswana
 British Armed Forces, the military of the United Kingdom of Great Britain and Northern Ireland
 Bulgarian Air Force

Other uses
 Baca language (ISO 639:b), a Southern Bantoid language of Cameroon
 .baf, a proprietary data format used by Bruker mass spectrometers
 Baptistina family, an asteroid family
 Barnes Municipal Airport, IATA airport code
 Basal area factor, used in forestry to calculate tree cover over land
 Belarus Athletic Federation
 Brigade d'autodéfense du français (BAF), an activist grouping in Quebec in defense of French language
 British Academy of Fencing
 British Air Ferries, a former airline
 Building a Future, an organization concerned with child poverty in Latin America
 Bunker adjustment factor, sea freight charges which represents additions due to oil prices
 The Turkish name for Paphos, Cyprus